Johal or (Chak No. 97/RB) is a village/town within the larger Jaranwala Town near Faisalabad located in the Faisalabad District, Punjab, Pakistan. 

The geographical coordinates of the town are: 31° 31' 0" North, 73° 23' 0" East.

References

Populated places in Faisalabad District
Faisalabad District